KCSO may refer to:

 Kaohsiung City Symphony Orchestra, an orchestra based in Kaohsiung, Taiwan
 KCSO-LD, a television station in California, United States